Hard is the fourth studio album by the English post-punk group Gang of Four. It was originally released in 1983 on Warner Bros. Records and was the first album to not feature original member Hugo Burnham, while Dave Allen had already left before the previous album, Songs of the Free.

The album was later reissued as part of a two-CD package along with the band's 1981 album Solid Gold.

Track listing
All tracks composed by Andy Gill and Jon King; except where indicated

 "Is It Love" (Gill) – 4:35
 "I Fled" – 3:54
 "Silver Lining" - 4:13
 "Woman Town" (Gill) - 5:12
 "A Man with a Good Car" - 3:45
 "It Don't Matter" - 3:54
 "Arabic" - 3:39
 "A Piece of My Heart" - 3:14
 "Independence" - 4:05

Personnel
Gang of Four
 Jon King - vocals, melodica
 Andrew Gill - guitar, vocals, additional drums
 Sara Lee - bass
with:
 Jon Astrop - bass on "Is It Love", "I Fled", "It Don't Matter" and "A Piece of My Heart"
 Alfa Anderson, Brenda White King, Chuck Kirkpatrick, John Sambataro - backing vocals
 Mike Lewis - conductor of strings and horns
Technical
John Rollo - recording
Scott Heiser - photography

References

1983 albums
Gang of Four (band) albums
EMI Records albums
Albums produced by Andy Gill